Lamont Allen Warren (born January 4, 1973) is a former professional American football running back. He played in the National Football League (NFL) for eight seasons with the Indianapolis Colts, New England Patriots, and Detroit Lions.

1973 births
Living people
American football running backs
Colorado Buffaloes football players
Detroit Lions players
Indianapolis Colts players
New England Patriots players
Players of American football from Indianapolis
Susan Miller Dorsey High School alumni